Queen on Fire – Live at the Bowl is a DVD/live album by the British rock band Queen released on 25 October 2004 in Europe and on 9 November 2004 in the US. It was recorded live at the Milton Keynes Bowl, Buckinghamshire, England, on 5 June 1982 during the Hot Space Tour. A DVD was also released with the complete concert and bonus material, such as band interviews and tour highlights.

In 2005, the album was also released as an LP. In the UK, the DVD made No. 1 and CD, No. 20 in the DVD and CD chart respectively. In the US, neither the DVD nor album charted.

Notes 
During the concert, lead guitarist Brian May had a few minor problems with his homemade Red Special guitar. During both the fast version of "We Will Rock You" and "Dragon Attack", two of the strings broke and he had to change to his Birch Red Special backup for most of "Action This Day" and for the entire second half of "Dragon Attack" and the entire duration of "Now I'm Here (Reprise)".

Before playing "Love of My Life", May played a snippet of the intro to "Las Palabras de Amor" calling it "a little fiddle around".

During May's guitar solo, the pickup switches of his guitar were switched off and May's guitar solo stopped for 20 seconds (the full 20 seconds is on the DVD, but the album version of the performance contains only 3 seconds). His guitar tech, Brian Zellis, helped May to get his guitar going again by simply turning back on the switches.

Drummer Roger Taylor and bass guitarist John Deacon performed impromptu solos during "Dragon Attack" and before "Under Pressure," respectively when May switched guitars during "Dragon Attack" and was getting his guitar fixed following his solo.

During "Fat Bottomed Girls", Freddie Mercury's voice very briefly slipped into an off-key falsetto during the lyric "in this locality" (the original error could be heard on the original BBC TV, Channel 4, MTV, an audience recording, and radio broadcasts of the concert) but the error was fixed for the release of the DVD and CD.

During the first verse of "Fat Bottomed Girls," instead of singing the original line "you made a bad boy out of me," Mercury sang "you made an asshole out of me."

Mercury performed without his trademark bottomless microphone stand for "We Will Rock You (Fast)", "Now I'm Here", and "The Hero" (shown on the Live in Japan bonus footage on DVD). This allowed Mercury to more freely scale and walk along the raised wings on either side of the stage.

Throughout the concert a member of the crowd can be heard using an air horn. The "air horn man" is thanked in the album's liner notes.

Due to censorship laws the Hong Kong and China release of the CD removed "Get Down, Make Love" and "Fat Bottomed Girls".

Track listing

Disc 1

Disc 2

DVD bonus material 
 MK Bowl backstage interview
 Freddie Mercury interview
 Brian May and Roger Taylor interviews
 Songs from concert at Stadthalle, Vienna, Austria on 12 May 1982
 "Another One Bites the Dust"
 "We Will Rock You"
 "We Are the Champions"
 "God Save the Queen"
 Songs from concert at Seibu Lions Stadium, Tokorozawa, Japan on 3 November 1982
 "Flash / The Hero"
 "Now I'm Here"
 "Impromptu"
 "Put Out the Fire"
 "Dragon Attack"
 "Now I'm Here (Reprise)"
 "Crazy Little Thing Called Love" 
 "Teo Torriatte (Let Us Cling Together)"
 Photo gallery (Calling All Girls)

Personnel 
Queen
Freddie Mercury – lead vocals, piano, acoustic guitar on "Crazy Little Thing Called Love"
Brian May – guitars, vocals, piano on "Save Me"
Roger Taylor – drums, percussion, vocals, co-lead vocals on verses of "Action This Day", and co-lead vocals on "Sheer Heart Attack"
John Deacon – bass guitar, rhythm guitar on "Staying Power", additional backing vocals on "Somebody to Love" and "Back Chat"
with:
Morgan Fisher – keyboards, piano
Technical
Justin Shirley-Smith – mix producer
Kris Fredriksson – Pro Tools HD
Reinhold Mack – recording engineer
Mick McKenna – second recording engineer
Tim Young – mastering
Richard Gray – artwork
Denis O'Regan – photography

Charts and certifications

Charts

Album

DVD

Certifications

Album

DVD

References

External links 
 Official YouTube videos: "Guitar Solo" (Live at the Bowl), Queen + Paul Rodgers – "Guitar Solo"
 Queen official website: Discography: On Fire Live At The Bowl (includes no lyrics)
 
 

Queen (band) live albums
Queen (band) video albums
2004 live albums
2004 video albums
Live video albums
Hollywood Records live albums
Hollywood Records video albums
Parlophone live albums
Parlophone video albums